Karley is a feminine given name. Notable people known by this name include the following:

Given name
Karley Sciortino American writer, television host, and producer

Fictional character
Karley, Brittany Snow character in 96 Minutes

See also

Carley (name)
Kaley Cuoco
Karle (name)
Karly